was a Japanese samurai of the Sengoku period through Azuchi-Momoyama period, who served the Tokugawa clan.

Samurai
1528 births
1598 deaths
Honda clan
People from Okazaki, Aichi